Robeson Channel is a body of water lying between Greenland and Canada's northernmost island, Ellesmere Island. It is the most northerly part of Nares Strait, linking Hall Basin to the south with the Arctic Ocean to the north. The Newman Fjord in Greenland has its mouth in the Robeson Channel.

Alert, the world's most northerly permanently inhabited settlement, lies nearby.

It was named during the 1871 Polaris Expedition, for American George Robeson, Secretary of the Navy in the Ulysses S. Grant administration.

Further reading

 Chow, R. K. Near-Surface Current in Robeson Channel. Defence Research Establishment Ottawa, 1975. 
 Dunbar, Moira, and John E. Keys. Robeson Channel Ice Drift and Oceanographic Measurements 1970-1975. Ottawa: [Defense Research Establishment Ottawa?], 1980. 
 Serson, H. V. Robeson Channel Experiment Main and Radar Camp-Plans and Operations. Ottawa: Dept. of National Defence, 1971. 

Straits of Greenland
Channels of Qikiqtaaluk Region
Canada–Greenland border
International straits